Expert Review of Pharmacoeconomics & Outcomes Research is a bimonthly peer-reviewed medical journal covering all aspects of pharmacoeconomics. It was established in 2001 and is published by Informa. The editor-in-chief is A. Bottomley (European Organisation for Research and Treatment of Cancer).

Abstracting and indexing 
The journal is abstracted and indexed in:

According to the Journal Citation Reports, the journal has a 2014 impact factor of 1.669.

References

External links 
 

English-language journals
Expert Review journals
Bimonthly journals
Publications established in 2001
Pharmacology journals